The 75th Carnatic Infantry were an infantry regiment of the British Indian Army. They could trace their origins to 1776, when they were raised as the 15th Carnatic Battalion by enlisting men from the 2nd, 6th and 12th Carnatic Battalions.

Their first action was during the Carnatic Wars. Followed by the Battle of Sholinghur in the Second Anglo-Mysore War, they also took part in the Third Anglo-Mysore War and the Third Burmese War.

After World War I the Indian government reformed the army moving from single battalion regiments to multi battalion regiments. In 1922, the 75th Carnatic Infantry became the 2nd Battalion, 3rd Madras Regiment. After independence this new regiment was allocated to the Indian Army.

Changes in designation
15th Carnatic Battalion - 1776
15th Madras Battalion - 1784
2nd Battalion, 4th Madras Native Infantry - 1796
15th Madras Native Infantry - 1824
15th Madras Infantry - 1885
75th Carnatic Infantry - 1903
2nd Battalion, 3rd Madras Regiment - 1922
2nd Battalion, The Madras Regiment (army of independent India) - 1947

References

Sources

Moberly, F.J. (1923). Official History of the War: Mesopotamia Campaign, Imperial War Museum. 

British Indian Army infantry regiments
Military history of the Madras Presidency
Military units and formations established in 1776
Military units and formations disestablished in 1922